Party Girl is a television show on Discovery Home in the U.S. The show follows party planner Cathy Riva as she helps clients throw amazing parties in the New York City area.

References

External links

Discovery Home (American network) original programming
2005 American television series debuts
2000s American reality television series